The African American founding fathers of the United States are the African Americans who worked to include the equality of all races as a fundamental principle of the United States of America. Beginning in the abolition movement of the 19th century, they worked for the abolition of slavery, and also for the abolition of second class status for free blacks. Their goals were temporarily realized in the late 1860s, with the passage of the 13th, 14th, and 15th amendments to the United States Constitution. However, after Reconstruction ended in 1877, the gains were partly lost and an era of Jim Crow gave blacks reduced social, economic and political status. The recovery was achieved in the Civil Rights Movement, especially in the 1950s and 1960s, under the leadership of blacks like Martin Luther King and James Bevel and whites like the Supreme Court and President Lyndon Johnson. In the 21st century scholars have studied the African American founding fathers in depth.

Reconstruction

Politics of Reconstruction
As the Civil War was ending, The major issues faced by President Abraham Lincoln were the status of the ex-slaves (called "Freedmen"), the loyalty and civil rights of ex-rebels, the status of the 11 ex-Confederate states, the powers of the federal government needed to prevent a future civil war, and the question of whether Congress or the President would make the major decisions.

The severe threats of starvation and displacement of the unemployed, unhoused freedmen were met by the first major federal relief agency, the Freedmen's Bureau, operated by the Army.

Three "Reconstruction Amendments" were passed to expand civil rights for black Americans: the Thirteenth Amendment  outlawed slavery; the Fourteenth Amendment guaranteed equal rights for all and citizenship for blacks; the Fifteenth Amendment prevented race from being used to disfranchise men.

Of more immediate usefulness  than the constitutional amendments, were laws passed by Congress to allow the federal government, through the new Justice Department and through the federal courts to enforce the new civil rights Even if the state governments ignored the problem. These included the Enforcement Acts of 1870–71 and the Civil Rights Act of 1875.

Ex-Confederates remained in control of most Southern states for more than two years, but that changed when the Radical Republicans gained control of Congress in the 1866 elections. President Andrew Johnson, who sought easy terms for reunions with ex-rebels, was virtually powerless; he escaped by one vote removal through impeachment. Congress enfranchised black men and temporarily suspended many ex-Confederate leaders of the right to hold office. New Republican governments came to power based on a coalition of Freedmen together with Carpetbaggers (new arrivals from the North), and Scalawags (native white Southerners). They were backed by the US Army. Opponents said they were corrupt and violated the rights of whites. The Republicans were in control of Southern state governments  but they were deeply factionalized. The white Republicans split between the more radical "carpetbaggers" (new arrivals from the North), and the more moderate "scalawags" (native whites who had opposed the Confederacy). Meanwhile the black Republicans were split between the more radical ex-slaves, and the more moderate ex-free blacks. State by state the multiple Republican factions battled verbally and sometimes physically, in the face of the better organized white coalition of "conservatives" (ex-Whigs) and Democrats.

In the 1870s state by state Republicans lost power to the conservative-Democratic coalition, which gained control by violence of the entire South by 1877. In response to Radical Reconstruction, the Ku Klux Klan (KKK) emerged in 1867 as a white-supremacist organization opposed to black civil rights and Republican rule. President Ulysses Grant's vigorous enforcement of the Ku Klux Klan Act of 1870 shut down the Klan, and it disbanded. But from 1868 onward in much of the South violence suppressed black voting and threatened black leaders. Rifle clubs had thousands of members.  Although the KKK was suppressed, by 1874, paramilitary  groups, such as the White League and Red Shirts disrupt the Republicans. Rable described them as the "military arm of the Democratic Party."

Reconstruction ended after the disputed 1876 election between Republican candidate Rutherford B. Hayes and Democratic candidate Samuel J. Tilden. With a compromise Hayes won the White House, the federal government withdrew its troops from the South, abandoning the freedmen to white conservative Democrats, who regained power in state governments.

Reconstruction as Second Founding of the United States

According to Professors Jeffrey K. Tulis and Nicole Mellow: The Founding, Reconstruction (often called “the second founding”), and the New Deal are typically heralded as the most significant turning points in the country’s history, with many observers seeing each of these as political triumphs through which the United States has come to more closely realize its liberal ideals of liberty and equality.  
Scholars such as  Eric Foner have recently expanded the theme into full-length books. Black abolitionists played a key role by stressing that freed blacks needed equal rights after slavery was abolished. Constitutional provision for racial equality for free blacks was enacted by a Congress led by  Thaddeus Stevens, Charles Sumner and Lyman Trumbull.  The "second founding" comprised the 13th, 14th and 15th amendments to the Constitution. All citizens now had federal rights that could be enforced in federal court. 
 
In a deep reaction called the Nadir of American race relations, after 1876 freedmen lost many of these rights and had second class citizenship in the era of lynching and Jim Crow laws. Finally in the 1950s the U.S, Supreme Court started to restore those rights. Under the public leadership of Martin Luther King, president of the Southern Christian Leadership Council, and the strategies of SCLC's Director of Direct Action, James Bevel, the nonviolent Civil Rights movement made the nation aware of the crisis, and under President Lyndon Johnson major civil rights legislation was passed in 1964, 1965, and 1968.

Organizations
Many black organizations promoted the goal of equality after 1865.

The Liberator

The Liberator (1831-1865) was the hard-hitting highly influential abolitionist newspaper run by William Lloyd Garrison, a white man based in Boston. Of the 4000 weekly subscribers, about 3000 were blacks. Garrison denounced the United States Constitution as hopelessly pro slavery, and discouraged political activism as a result. Frederick Douglass at first followed Garrison, but broke with him in 1851, and promoted political action among free blacks in the North.

American Anti-Slavery Society

The interacial American Anti-Slavery Society (AASS) was formed in 1833, and grew rapidly to at least 100,000 members by 1840.

NERL 

The all-black National Equal Rights League} was founded in upstate New York in 1864 and had chapters across the North.

Union League
The Union League was a originally a network of elite local clubs in the North, founded in 1862 to support the Union war effort. After 1867 it included biracial local organizations across the South to promote racial equality and support the Republican Party. During Reconstruction the great majority of Southern blacks joined a local unit.

Niagara Movement

NAACP

LDF, the NAACP Legal Defense and Educational Fund

A totally separate organization from the NAACP, the NAACP Legal Defense and Educational Fund (LDF) was set up by Thurgood Marshall in 1940; it became fully independent of the NAACP in 1957. While NAACP is a membership organization with chapters across the country, LDF is a law firm in New York City that focuses on civil rights lawsuits. It has handled many major cases, with Brown v. Board of Education in 1954 the most famous. In Brown the Supreme Court ruled segregated schools violated the 14th Amendment. Jack Greenberg (1924–2016) succeeded Thurgood Marshall as the Director-Counsel of the LDF from 1961 to 1984.

Activists

Historians in recent years have compiled directories of black leaders in the 19th century.

Richard Allen 

Bishop Richard Allen (1760-1831) was the founder of the African Methodist Episcopal Church, the largest of the nation's all-black organizations.  Elected the first bishop of the AME Church in 1816, Allen focused on organizing a denomination in which free Black people could worship without racial oppression and enslaved people could find a measure of dignity. He worked to upgrade the social status of the Black community, organizing Sabbath schools to teach literacy and promoting national organizations to develop political strategies.

James Forten
James Forten (1766–1842) was an African-American abolitionist and wealthy businessman in Philadelphia. He  used his wealth and social standing to work for civil rights for African Americans in both the city and nationwide. Beginning in 1817, he opposed the colonization movements, particularly that of the American Colonization Society. He affirmed African Americans' claim to a stake in the United States of America. He persuaded William Lloyd Garrison to adopt an anti-colonization position and helped fund his newspaper The Liberator (1831–1865), frequently publishing letters on public issues. He became vice-president of the biracial American Anti-Slavery Society, founded in 1833, and worked for national abolition of slavery. His large family was also devoted to these causes, and two daughters married the Purvis brothers, who used their wealth as leaders for abolition.

Frederick Douglass

According to biographer David Blight, Douglass, (1817–1895), "played a pivotal role in America's Second Founding out of the apocalypse of the Civil War, and he very much wished to see himself as a founder and a defender of the Second American Republic." By 1851 Douglass broke bitterly with Garrison and now worked for abolition and equality through the U.S. Constitution and political system.

Henry McNeal Turner

In 1863 during the American Civil War, Turner (1834–1915) was appointed by the US Army as the first African-American chaplain in the United States Colored Troops. After the war, he was appointed to the Freedmen's Bureau in Georgia. He settled in Macon and was elected to the state legislature in 1868 during the Reconstruction era. An A.M.E. missionary, he also planted many AME churches in Georgia after the war.  In 1880 he was elected as the first Southern bishop of the AME Church, after a fierce battle within the denomination because of its Northern roots. 

Angered by the Democrats' regaining power and instituting Jim Crow laws in the late nineteenth century South, Turner began to support black nationalism and emigration of blacks to the African continent.

Ida B. Wells

Ida B. Wells (1862–1931) was an  investigative journalist, educator, and leader in the civil rights movement. She was one of the founders (NAACP). Wells dedicated her lifetime to combating prejudice and violence, the fight for African-American equality, especially that of women, and became the most famous Black woman in the United States of her time. In the 1890s, Wells documented lynching in the United States in articles and through her pamphlets called Southern Horrors: Lynch Law in all its Phases, and The Red Record, investigating frequent claims of whites that lynchings were reserved for Black criminals only. Wells exposed lynching as a barbaric practice of whites in the South used to intimidate and oppress African Americans who created economic and political competition—and a subsequent threat of loss of power—for whites. Well's pamphlet set out to tell the truth behind the rising violence in the South against African Americans. At this time, the white press continued to paint the African Americans involved in the incident as villains and whites as innocent victims.

Booker T. Washington

W.E.B. Du Bois

W. E. B. Du Bois (1868–1963) was an academic sociologist and activist. He rose  to national prominence as a leader of the Niagara Movement, a group of African-American activists who wanted equal rights for blacks. Du Bois and his supporters opposed the Atlanta compromise, an agreement crafted by Booker T. Washington which provided that Southern blacks would work and submit to white political rule, while Southern whites guaranteed that blacks would receive basic educational and economic opportunities. Instead, Du Bois insisted on full civil rights and increased political representation, which he believed would be brought about by the African-American intellectual elite. He referred to this group as the Talented Tenth, a concept under the umbrella of racial uplift, and believed that African Americans needed the chances for advanced education to develop its leadership. He helped organize the NAACP as a counterweight to Washington's powerful grass roots organizations. Racism was the main target of Du Bois's polemics, and he strongly protested against lynching, Jim Crow laws, and discrimination in education and employment. His cause included people of color everywhere, particularly Africans and Asians in colonies. He was a proponent of Pan-Africanism and helped organize several Pan-African Congresses to fight for the independence of African colonies from European powers.

Thurgood Marshall

Evaluating the original Constitution
Thurgood Marshall was the first African American justice of the Supreme Court. At the 200th anniversary of the Constitution in 1987, he argued: I do not believe that the meaning of the Constitution was forever “fixed” at the Philadelphia Convention.  Nor do I find the wisdom, foresight, and sense of justice exhibited by the framers particularly profound. To the contrary, the government they devised was defective from the start, requiring several amendments, a civil war, and momentous social transformations to attain the system of constitutional government, and its respect for the individual freedoms and human rights, we hold as fundamental today. When contemporary Americans cite "The Constitution," they invoke a concept that is vastly different from what the framers began to construct two centuries ago....While the Union survived the civil war, the Constitution did not. In its place arose a new, more promising basis for justice and equality, the 14th Amendment, ensuring protection of the life, liberty, and property of all persons against deprivations without due process, and guaranteeing equal protection of the laws.

Additional images

See also 

 Civil rights movement (1865–1896)
 Civil rights movement (1896–1954) and Nadir of American race relations 
 Civil rights movement (1954-1968)
 Founding Fathers of the United States
 Reconstruction Amendments
 Twenty-fourth Amendment to the United States Constitution
 History of civil rights in the United States
 List of African-American abolitionists
 List of civil rights leaders
 Quakers in the abolition movement
 Timeline of the civil rights movement
 Black Lives Matter
 Post–civil rights era in African-American history

Notes

Further reading
 Carter Jr, William M. "The Second Founding and the First Amendment." Texas Law Review 99 (2020): 1065+. online
 Davis, Hugh.   "We Will Be Satisfied with Nothing Less:" The African American Struggle for Equal Rights in the North during Reconstruction. (Cornell University Press, 2011).
 Davis, Thulani. The Emancipation Circuit: Black Activism Forging a Culture of Freedom (Duke University Press, 2022).

 Epps, Garrett. "Second Founding: The Story of the Fourteenth Amendment." Oregon Law Review 85 (2006) pp: 895-911 online. 
 Fischer, David Hackett. African Founders: How Enslaved People Expanded American Ideals (Simon and Schuster, 2022)  excerpt

 Fitzgerald, Michael W. The Union League Movement in the Deep South: Politics and Agricultural Change During Reconstruction  (1989) online

 Foner, Eric. The Second Founding: How the Civil War and Reconstruction Remade the Constitution (W.W. Norton, 2020)   online; also see online review

 Fox, Jr, James W. "The Constitution of Black Abolitionism: Reframing the Second Founding." University of Pennsylvania Journal of Constitutional Law 23 (2021) pp: 267–350. online; based on documents from the state and national conventions of African Americans, 1831 to 1864.

 Hodges, Graham Russell Gao. David Ruggles: a radical black abolitionist and the Underground Railroad in New York City (2010) online

 Holt, Thomas C. Children of fire : a history of African Americans (2010) online

 Kachun, Mitch. "From Forgotten Founder to Indispensable Icon: Crispus Attacks, Black Citizenship, and Collective Memory, 1770-1865." Journal of the Early Republic 29.2 (2009): 249–286. online
Loewenberg, Bert James and Ruth Bogin.  Black Women in Nineteenth-Century American Life: Their Words, Their Thoughts, Their Feelings (Pennsylvania State UP, 1976).
 

 McPherson, James M. The struggle for equality: Abolitionists and the Negro in the Civil War and Reconstruction (1964) online
 McPherson, James M. The abolitionist legacy  from Reconstruction to the NAACP (1995) online
 McPherson, James M. The Negro's Civil War: how American Blacks felt and acted during the war for the Union (1965) online
 Newman, Richard S. and Roy E. Finkenbine, "Black Founders in the New Republic" William and Mary Quarterly (2007) 64#1 pp. 83–94 online
 Newman, Richard S. Freedom’s Prophet: Bishop Richard Allen, the AME Church, and the Black Founding Fathers (2009). 
 Quigley, David. Second Founding: New York City, Reconstruction, and the Making of American Democracy (Hill and Wang, 2003) 
 Rabinowitz, Howard N. ed. Southern Black Leaders of the Reconstruction Era (University of Illinois Press, 1982).
 Roosevelt III, Kermit. The Nation That Never Was: Reconstructing America’s Story (U of Chicago Press, 2022).
 Taylor, Brian. Fighting for Citizenship: Black Northerners and the Debate over Military Service in the Civil War (University Of North Carolina Press, 2020). review

 Underwood, James Lowell, et al. eds. At Freedom's Door: African American Founding Fathers and Lawyers in Reconstruction South Carolina  (U. of South Carolina Press, 2000.) excerpt; see also  online review
 Walton, Hanes, Robert C. Smith, and Sherri L. Wallace. American politics and the African American quest for universal freedom (9th ed. Routledge, 2020) excerpt
 Wurman, Ilan. The Second Founding: An Introduction to the Fourteenth Amendment (Cambridge UP, 2020) excerpt
 Yee, Shirley J. Black Women Abolitionists: Study in Activism, 1828-1860 (1992) online

Primary sources

 Ripley, C. Peter, ed. The Black Abolitionist Papers. Volume III: The United States, 1830-1846 (U North Carolina Press, 1991)
 The Black Abolitionist Papers, Volume IV: The United States, 1847-1858 (1991)
 The Black Abolitionist Papers, Volume V: The United States, 1859-1865  (1992)

External links

  "Encyclopedia of Slavery and Abolition in the United States", with over 500 short biographies
The Antislavery Literature Project major academic center for primary sources
American Abolitionists and Antislavery Activists, comprehensive list of abolitionists and antislavery activists and organizations in the United States, including historic biographies and antislavery timelines
 Forten family exhibit, Museum of American Revolution

African-American abolitionists
 
History of African-American civil rights
History of civil rights in the United States
Movements for civil rights
Martin Luther King Jr.
American democracy activists